In finite geometry, PG(3,2) is the smallest three-dimensional projective space. It can be thought of as an extension of the Fano plane.
It has 15 points, 35 lines, and 15 planes.  It also has the following properties:
 Each point is contained in 7 lines and 7 planes
 Each line is contained in 3 planes and contains 3 points
 Each plane contains 7 points and 7 lines
 Each plane is isomorphic to the Fano plane
 Every pair of distinct planes intersect in a line
 A line and a plane not containing the line intersect in exactly one point

Constructions

Construction from K6 
Take a complete graph K6. It has 15 edges, 15 perfect matchings and 20 triangles. Create a point for each of the 15 edges, and a line for each of the 20 triangles and 15 matchings. The incidence structure between each triangle or matching (line) to its three constituent edges (points), induces a PG(3,2).

Construction from Fano planes 
Take a Fano plane and apply all 5040 permutations of its 7 points. Discard duplicate planes to obtain a set of 30 distinct Fano planes. Pick any of the 30, and pick the 14 others that have exactly one line in common with the first, not 0 or 3. The incidence structure between the 1+14 = 15 Fano planes and the 35 triplets they mutually cover induces a PG(3,2).

Representations

Tetrahedral depiction 
PG(3,2) can be represented as a tetrahedron. The 15 points correspond to the 4 vertices + 6 edge-midpoints + 4 face-centers + 1 body-center. The 35 lines correspond to the 6 edges + 12 face-medians + 4 face-incircles + 4 altitudes from a face to the opposite vertex + 3 lines connecting the midpoints of opposite edges + 6 ellipses connecting each edge midpoint with its two non-neighboring face centers. The 15 planes consist of the 4 faces + the 6 "medial" planes connecting each edge to the midpoint of the opposite edge + 4 "cones" connecting each vertex to the incircle of the opposite face + one "sphere" with the 6 edge centers and the body center. This was described by Burkhard Polster.

Square representation

PG(3,2) can be represented as a square. The 15 points are assigned 4-bit binary coordinates from 0001 to 1111, augmented with a point labeled 0000, and arranged in a 4x4 grid. Lines correspond to the equivalence classes of sets of four vertices that XOR together to 0000. With certain arrangements of the vertices in the 4x4 grid, such as the "natural" row-major ordering or the Karnaugh map ordering, the lines form symmetric sub-structures like rows, columns, transversals, or rectangles, as seen in the figure. (There are 20160 such orderings, as seen below in the section on Automorphisms.) This representation is possible because geometrically the 35 lines are represented as a bijection with the 35 ways to partition a 4x4 affine space into 4 parallel planes of 4 cells each. This was described by Steven H. Cullinane.

Doily depiction 

The Doily diagram often used to represent the generalized quadrangle GQ(2,2) is also used to represent PG(3,2). This was described by Richard Doily.

Kirkman's schoolgirl problem
PG(3,2) arises as a background in some solutions of Kirkman's schoolgirl problem. Two of the seven non-isomorphic solutions to this problem can be embedded as structures in the Fano 3-space. In particular, a spread of PG(3,2) is a partition of points into disjoint lines, and corresponds to the arrangement of girls (points) into disjoint rows (lines of a spread) for a single day of Kirkman's schoolgirl problem. There are 56 different spreads of 5 lines each. A packing of PG(3,2) is a partition of the 35 lines into 7 disjoint spreads of 5 lines each, and corresponds to a solution for all seven days. There are 240 packings of PG(3,2), that fall into two conjugacy classes of 120 under the action of PGL(4,2) (the collineation group of the space); a correlation interchanges these two classes.

Automorphisms 
The automorphism group of PG(3,2) maps lines to lines. The number of automorphisms is given by finding the number of ways of selecting 4 points that are not coplanar; this works out to 15⋅14⋅12⋅8 = 20160 = 8!/2. It turns out that the automorphism group of PG(3,2) is isomorphic to the alternating group on 8 elements A8.

Coordinates 
It is known that a PG(n,2) can be coordinatized with (GF(2))n + 1, i.e. a bit string of length n + 1. PG(3,2) can therefore be coordinatized with 4-bit strings.

In addition, the line joining points  and  can be naturally assigned Plücker coordinates  where , and the line coordinates satisfy . Each line in projective 3-space thus has six coordinates, and can be represented as a point in projective 5-space; the points lie on the surface .

Notes

References
 
 
 

Projective geometry
Finite geometry
Incidence geometry